Aksana Yauhenauna Dziamidava (born December 23, 1993) is a Belarusian swimmer, who specialized in sprint freestyle events. She won a bronze medal, as a member of the Belarusian swimming team, in the women's 4×50 m freestyle at the 2012 European Short Course Swimming Championships in Chartres, France.

Dziamidava represented Belarus at the 2012 Summer Olympics in London, where she qualified for the women's 4 × 100 m freestyle relay, along with her teammates Yuliya Khitraya, Sviatlana Khakhlova, and double Olympic silver medalist Aliaksandra Herasimenia. Swimming the third leg, Dziamidava posted her time of 55.94 seconds, and the Belarusian team went on to finish the first heat in seventh place and thirteenth overall, setting a new national record time of 3:40.67.

References

External links
NBC Olympics Profile 
 

1993 births
Living people
Olympic swimmers of Belarus
Swimmers at the 2012 Summer Olympics
Belarusian female freestyle swimmers
Swimmers at the 2010 Summer Youth Olympics
Sportspeople from Minsk